Eurrhyparodes is a genus of moths of the family Crambidae.

Species
Eurrhyparodes bracteolalis (Zeller, 1852)
Eurrhyparodes calis Druce, 1902
Eurrhyparodes diffracta Meyrick, 1936
Eurrhyparodes leechi South in Leech & South, 1901
Eurrhyparodes lygdamis Druce, 1902
Eurrhyparodes multilinea Bethune-Baker, 1906 
Eurrhyparodes nymphulalis Strand, 1918
Eurrhyparodes plumbeimarginalis Hampson, 1898
Eurrhyparodes sculdus Dyar, 1914
Eurrhyparodes splendens Druce, 1895
Eurrhyparodes syllepidia Hampson, 1898
Eurrhyparodes tricoloralis (Zeller, 1852)

Former species
Eurrhyparodes voralis Schaus, 1920

References

Encyclopedia of Life

Spilomelinae
Crambidae genera